The following is a list of notable alumni of the University of Chile.

Government, law, and public policy

Heads of state
 Pedro Aguirre Cerda (1938–1941) lawyer and teacher
 Arturo Alessandri (1920–1925; 1932–1938) lawyer
 Jorge Alessandri (1958–1964) engineer
 Salvador Allende (1971–1973) physician
 Patricio Aylwin (1990–1994) lawyer
 Michelle Bachelet (2006–2010) physician
 Ramón Barros Luco (1910–1915) lawyer
 Carlos Dávila (de facto leader) lawyer
 Federico Errázuriz Echaurren (1896–1901) lawyer
 Federico Errázuriz Zañartu (1871–1876) lawyer
 Emiliano Figueroa (1925–1927) lawyer
 Eduardo Frei Ruiz-Tagle (1994–2000) civil engineer
 Gabriel González Videla (1946–1952) lawyer
 Ricardo Lagos (2000–2006) lawyer
 Juan Esteban Montero (1931–1932) lawyer
 Pedro Montt (1906–1910) lawyer
 Aníbal Pinto (1876–1881) lawyer
 Germán Riesco (1901–1906) lawyer
 Juan Luis Sanfuentes (1915–1920) lawyer
 Domingo Santa María (1881–1886) lawyer

Foreign heads of state
 José López Portillo (México: 1976–1982) lawyer
 Carlos Mesa (Bolivia) lawyer
 Camilo Ponce Enríquez (politician) (Ecuador: 1956–1960) lawyer

Non-Chilean politicians
 Schafik Handal general secretary of Farabundo Martí National Liberation Front of El Salvador; law studies
 Marcelo Quiroga Santa Cruz socialist political leader from Bolivia; brutally abducted and subsequently assassinated by military forces in 1980; law and drama studies
 José Vicente Rangel Vice President of Venezuela (2002–2007); law studies
 José Serra Governor of São Paulo state and Minister of Foreign Affairs of Brazil; Masters in Economics.

Notable lawyers
 Cecilia Medina Gruber Prize recipient, judge
 Arturo Prat Chacón national hero, lawyer
 José Zalaquett lawyer and professor on Human Rights, National Prize for Humanities and Social Sciences 2003

Civil Servants
 Joaquín Marcó Figueroa  superintendent of the Casa de Moneda de Chile, and author

Business
 Eliodoro Matte industrial engineer; billionaire; president of Empresas CMPC
 Julio Ponce Lerou forestry engineer; businessman; controlling shareholder of Sociedad Química y Minera de Chile

Economists
 Armando Di Filippo Argentine economist
 Eduardo Engel engineer and economist 
 Manfred Max Neef Right Livelihood Award winner, economist
 Aníbal Pinto Santa Cruz economist National Prize for Humanities and Social Sciences 1995
 Paulo Renato Souza economist and politician

Arts

Literature
 José Donoso National Literature Prize 1990
 Roque Dalton Salvadoran poet and activist
 Jorge Edwards National Literature Prize 1994
 Alberto Fuguet writer, journalist, film director
 Gabriela Mistral Nobel Prize 1945, National Literature Prize 1951; teacher
 Pablo Neruda Nobel Prize 1971, National Literature Prize 1945
 Mariano Picón Salas National Literature Prize of Venezuela 1954
 Antonio Skármeta writer
 Volodia Teitelboim National Literature Prize 2002

Music
 Luis Advis
 Mario Iriarte
 Víctor Jara
 Sergio Ortega
 Sonia Paz Soto-Aguilar Orellana (Pachi)
 Pablo Rosetti (Pablo)
 Horacio Salinas
 Santiago Vera-Rivera

Visual arts
 Graciela Aranis
 Matilde Pérez
 Laura Rodig 
 Cecilia Vicuña
 Catalina Bauer
 Benjamín Vicuña
 Ximena Cristi

Humanities and Social Sciences

Anthropology
 María Ester Grebe ethnomusicologist
 Sonia Montecino National Prize for Humanities and Social Sciences 2013

History
 José Toribio Medina bibliographer, prolific writer and historian 
 Gabriel Salazar National Prize of History 2006
 Benjamín Vicuña Mackenna prolific writer and historian

Philosophy
 Carla Cordua Roberto Torretti National Prize for Humanities and Social Sciences 2011
 Humberto Giannini National Prize for Humanities and Social Sciences 1999
 Olga Grau, writer, professor, philosopher

Sociology
 Manuel Antonio Garretón National Prize for Humanities and Social Sciences 2007
 Emir Sader Brazilian sociologist, one of the World Social Forum organizers
 Clodomir Santos de Morais Brazilian sociologist who originated the Organization Workshop (OW) and the associated Activity-based Large Group Capacitation Method (LGCM)

Exact sciences
 Justicia Acuña
 Ricardo Baeza-Yates
 Claudio Bunster
 Claudio Donoso
 Cristina Dorador
 Eric Goles
 Humberto Maturana National Prize of Natural Sciences 1994
 Hugo K. Sievers